Qiwam al-Dawla Kerbogha,  known as Kerbogha or Karbughā, was atabeg of Mosul during the First Crusade and was renowned as a soldier.

Early life 

Kerbogha was a Seljuk Turk who owed his success to his military talent. He supported Malik-Shah I's wife Terken Khatun and her four-year-old son Mahmud I who was installed on the throne at Baghdad. Kerbogha was sent with an army to secure Isfahan and to arrest Berkyaruq. However, Mahmud's supporters were defeated by Berkyaruq' forces at Isfahan in January 1093. A month later, he joined the Seljuk prince Ismail ibn Yaquti against Berkyaruq army which was victorious once more. Later on, Kerbogha joined Berkyaruq, then he was sent in 1094 to fight against Tutush I who declared himself Sultan in Syria, but he was imprisoned along with his brother Altuntaş in Aleppo then Homs. Upon the death of Tutush, he was released by Fakhr al-Mulk Radwan.

In 1095, he served under the Abbasid Caliph Al-Mustazhir in his attempted reconquest of Aleppo. In 1096, he managed to capture Harran, Nisbis and Mosul, in which he ended the Uqaylid Dynasty rule.

The First Crusade 

In 1098, when he heard that the Crusaders had besieged Antioch, he gathered his troops and marched to relieve the city. On his way, he attempted to regain Edessa following its recent conquest by Baldwin I, so as not to leave any Frankish garrisons behind him on his way to Antioch. For three weeks he pointlessly besieged the city before deciding to continue on to Antioch. His reinforcements could have perhaps ended the Crusade before the walls of Antioch, and, indeed, the whole Crusade was perhaps saved by his time wasted at Edessa. By the time he arrived, around June 7, the Crusaders had already won the siege, and had held the city since 3 June. They were not able to restock the city before Kerbogha, in turn, began besieging the city.

During the siege, on 27 June, Peter the Hermit was sent as emissary to Kerbogha by the Crusaders to suggest that the parties settle all differences by a duel. Presumably feeling his position secure, Kerbogha did not see this course of action as being in his interest, and he declined.

Meanwhile, inside the city, Peter Bartholomew claimed to have discovered the Holy Lance through a vision. This discovery re-energized the Christian army. At the same time, disagreements and infighting broke out within the Atabeg's army. Kerbogha's mighty army was actually made up of levies from Baghdad, Persia, Palestine and Damascus, and the internal quarrels amongst the Emirs took precedence over any unity against the Franks. The only thing that united his allies was a common fear of Kerbogha's real goal, which was the conquest of all their lands. If Antioch fell to him, he would have been invincible.

On 28 June, when Bohemond, the leader of the Christian army, decided to attack, the Emirs decided to humble Kerbogha by abandoning him at the critical moment. Kerbogha was taken by surprise by the organization and discipline of the Christian army. This motivated, unified Christian army was in fact so large that Kerbogha's strategy of dividing his own forces was ineffective. He was quickly routed by the Crusaders. He was forced to retreat, and returned to Mosul a broken man.

Later life 
Despite his defeats outside of the cities of both Edessa and Antioch, Kerbogha's position in Mosul went unchallenged through the rest of his life. He spent time raising Imad ad-Din Zengi, the namesake of the Zengid dynasty, who took power in Mosul in 1127 following the rule of a series of Seljuk vassals after Kerbogha's death in 1102.

See also
Baldwin and Arnold of Beauvais
Baldwin I of Jerusalem
First Crusade
Siege of Antioch

References

Sources 
 
 
 

Turkic rulers
Muslims of the First Crusade
Atabegs
11th-century Turkic people
Government officials of the Seljuk Empire
11th-century rulers in Asia
Emirs of Mosul
Year of birth missing
1102 deaths